The Newquist Group is a social organization associated with the Church of Jesus Christ of Latter-day Saints (LDS) intended to provide a forum for discussion of freedom and morality.

1960s and 1970s 

A meeting of LDS members was first convened on Conference Saturday at the Utah Hotel in Salt Lake City, Utah, in the mid-1960s as an unnamed group to provide a forum for discussion of Church elder Jerreld Newquist's Prophets, Principles and National Survival, a compendium of LDS leaders' statements on the three titular subjects.

Reconstitution, 1989 on 

After Newquist's death in 1975, the group was dormant until 1989, when local businessman and John Birch Society National Council member David Jorgensen reconstituted the group under the name Newquist Group. It has continued to meet regularly since.  In 2019, the group sided with the John Birch Society and other constitutional traditionalists to oppose Article V convention-based changes to the United States constitution.

External links
Main web page
2018 Newquist Breakfast
Newquist David Jorgensen Youtube presentation

References 

Semiannual events
Latter Day Saint culture